Mount Helen is located in the Lewis Range, Glacier National Park in the U.S. state of Montana. The Continental Divide of the Americas passes over the summit of Mount Helen.

Geology

Like the mountains in Glacier National Park, Mt. Helen is composed of sedimentary rock laid down during the Precambrian to Jurassic periods.

Climate

Based on the Köppen climate classification, Mt. Helen is located in an alpine subarctic climate zone characterized by long, usually very cold winters, and short, cool to mild summers. Temperatures can drop below −10 °F with wind chill factors below −30 °F.

See also
 Mountains and mountain ranges of Glacier National Park (U.S.)

References

Mountains of Glacier County, Montana
Mountains of Glacier National Park (U.S.)
Mountains of Flathead County, Montana
Lewis Range
Mountains of Montana